Huzhu Tu Autonomous County, or in short Huzhu County, is an autonomous county under the jurisdiction of the prefecture-level city of Haidong, in the east of Qinghai province, China, bordering Gansu province to the northeast. Its seat is the town of Weiyuan.

The Xining Caojiabao Airport (IATA: XNN, ICAO: ZLXN) which serves Xining, capital of Qinghai Province, is located in the county.

Climate

See also
 List of administrative divisions of Qinghai

References

External links
 Official Website 
 Chubsang Gompa

County-level divisions of Qinghai
Haidong
Monguor autonomous counties